Tan Sri Khoo Teck Puat (13 January 1917 – 21 February 2004) was a banker and hotel owner, who, with an estimated fortune of S$4.3 billion (US$3,195,953,500), was the wealthiest man in Singapore at one point. He owned the Goodwood Group of boutique hotels in London and Singapore and was the largest single shareholder of the British bank Standard Chartered. The bulk of his fortune came from shares in Standard Chartered, which he bought up in the 1980s to help thwart Lloyds Bank's proposed acquisition which many financiers deemed hostile. The Goodwood Park Hotel in Singapore, built in 1900, is a restored historic landmark.

Around the period of his death in 2004, Khoo was ranked as the 108th richest person in the world by the business magazine Forbes. Khoo's estate has donated S$80 million to Duke–NUS Medical School.

Biography
Khoo received his early education in St Joseph's Institution in Singapore in 1930.  He was educated up to standard eight prior to his marriage at the age of 17, and started working in the bank Oversea-Chinese Banking Corporation (OCBC) as an apprentice bank clerk by 1933. While attached with OCBC, Khoo served as the Chairman of Central Provident Fund (CPF) Board for a year in 1958. His rise in OCBC was rapid and he developed strong ties with Tan Chin Tuan until they had a difference of opinion which resulted him leaving OCBC in 1959 as the general manager. He argued that OCBC was growing far too slowly and not opening enough branches in the smaller towns in Peninsular Malaya.

Career
In 1960, Khoo restarted his career in banking by founding Malayan Banking (now commonly known as Maybank) with a few partners in Kuala Lumpur. The bank grew rapidly to more than 150 branches within three years.

In 1963, the bank purchased Goodwood Park Hotel in Singapore for S$4.8 million.

From 1964 to 1965, Khoo was a senator in the Malaysian parliament.

In 1965, Khoo was ousted from Maybank by the Malaysian government under Deputy Prime Minister Tun Abdul Razak on the pretext of pumping the bank's money into his own private firm in Singapore.

In 1968, Khoo bought over Maybank's Singapore properties, including Goodwood Park Hotel and Central Properties, for S$50 million. While bitter with what the Malaysian government did, Khoo retained his Malaysian citizenship.

In 1976, he ceased to be a director of Maybank. Though he had opened the national bank of Brunei in the 1960s, his search for a legitimate banking vehicle continued.

In 1981, Khoo bought Australia's Southern Pacific Hotel Corporation – parent of the Travelodge chain – using funds from the National Bank of Brunei. He sold it in 1988 as part of his asset liquidation process to make restitution to the Bruneian government.

After the death of the former Sultan Omar in 1986, Sultan Hassanal arranged for an investigation into the finances of the National Bank, leading to its closure. Khoo had allegedly taken unsecured and undocumented loans of more than £300 million from the bank. He was never charged, but his son Khoo Ban Hock served two years in prison for his role in the affair.

In 1986, an opportunity arose when as a white knight, Khoo made a dramatic acquisition of a 5% stake in the British bank Standard Chartered, being one of three financiers who came to the rescue of Standard Chartered to stave off a hostile takeover by Lloyds Bank. He subsequently grew his stake to almost 15% to become the single largest shareholder.

In 1990, Khoo made a contribution of S$10 million to the Singapore government's 25th anniversary charity fund – to help children, the elderly and the disabled.  He was listed as Singapore's richest businessman by the business magazine Forbes in 2003.

In 2004, after Khoo died at Mount Elizabeth Hospital from a heart attack, it was revealed that he has a bigger stake in three of his listed companies Goodwood Park, Hotel Malaysia and Central Properties than it was disclosed to the Singapore Exchange. His daughters, Jacqueline and Elizabeth, who were in management positions at the companies, were fined a total of S$500,000. Khoo left his Standard Chartered stake, then approximately 11.5%, to his children.

In March 2006, they sold it to Singapore's Temasek Holdings.

Philanthropy
In 1981, Khoo set up the Khoo Foundation, a charity fund, with an initial S$20 million. The foundation donated S$125 million towards the construction and operation of a hospital, Alexandra hospital @ Yishun, in Yishun, Singapore.  In 2007, the hospital was subsequently renamed after Khoo as Khoo Teck Puat Hospital in recognition of the contribution by the Khoo foundation.

Honours
  : 
 Commander of the Order of Loyalty to the Crown of Malaysia (PSM) – Tan Sri (1966)
  : 
 Knight Grand Commander of the Order of the Crown of Terengganu (SPMT) – Dato' (1965)

References

Bibliography
Archibald, J. F.; Haynes, J., The bulletin, Issues 5642–5649, 1988
Forbes, Bertie Charles, Forbes, Volume 154, Issues 1–5, Forbes Inc., 1994

External links

Forbes.com: Forbes World's Richest People

 

1917 births
2004 deaths
Hokkien businesspeople
Malaysian billionaires
Malaysian bankers
Malaysian chairpersons of corporations
Saint Joseph's Institution, Singapore alumni
Singaporean billionaires
Singaporean businesspeople
Singaporean chairpersons of corporations
Singaporean philanthropists
Singaporean people of Hokkien descent
Members of the Dewan Negara
Malaysian company founders
Knights Grand Commander of the Order of the Crown of Terengganu
Commanders of the Order of Loyalty to the Crown of Malaysia
20th-century philanthropists
20th-century Australian businesspeople